Mahrous is a surname. Notable people with the surname include:

 Amir Mahrous (born 1998), Italian football player
 Issam Mahrous, Syrian footballer
 Moataz Mahrous (born 1984), Egyptian footballer
 Nizar Mahrous (born 1963), Syrian footballer and manager